Li Yuwei (Chinese: 李玉伟; born July 20, 1965 in Shenyang, Liaoning) is a male Chinese sports shooter. He won the 1984 Los Angeles Olympic Games in the 50 m Running Target.

Yuwei attended university of Central China

Major performances
1984 Los Angeles Olympic Games - 1st 50m moving target standard speed
1986 World Championships - 1st moving target mixed speed team
1987 World Cup - 1st moving target mixed speed (396pts) & standard speed (685pts)

References
  - China Daily

1965 births
Living people
Running target shooters
Olympic shooters of China
Shooters at the 1984 Summer Olympics
Olympic gold medalists for China
Olympic medalists in shooting
Sport shooters from Shenyang
Chinese male sport shooters

Medalists at the 1984 Summer Olympics